Chen Lijun (Chinese 谌利军; born 8 February 1993) is a Chinese weightlifter, Olympic Champion, four time World Champion and two time Asian Champion competing in the 62 kg division until 2018 and 67 kg starting in 2018 after the International Weightlifting Federation reorganized the categories.

Career

Olympics
He competed at the 2016 Summer Olympics in the 62 kg division but was forced to withdraw from the competition after his second snatch attempt due to legs cramps.

In 2021 at the 2020 Summer Olympics, he won the gold medal in the Men's 67kg category, lifting 145 kg in the Snatch and 187 kg in the Clean and Jerk for a 332 kg total, with new Olympic records set in the clean and jerk, and overall total.

World Championships
He competed at the 2013 World Championships in the Men's 62 kg class, lifting 146 kg in the Snatch and 175 kg in the Clean and Jerk for a 321 kg total, winning silver medals in the snatch and the clean & jerk and a gold medal in the total.

In 2015, he competed at the 2015 World Championships in the 62 kg class, lifting 150 kg in the snatch and a world record 183 kg in the clean & jerk for a world record 333 kg total, earning a silver medal in the Snatch and gold medals in the Clean and Jerk and total.

In 2018, the IWF restructured the weight classes and he competed in the 67 kg category as the 2018 World Championships. Coming into the competition he was the heavy favorite to win, and after the snatch portion he was in second place, 2 kg behind the snatch gold medalist Huang Minhao. In the clean & jerk portion he successfully lifted 182 kg in his second attempt giving him a total world record of 332 kg and his third World Championships win.

Major results

References

External links

Chinese male weightlifters
1993 births
Living people
Weightlifters at the 2014 Asian Games
Asian Games medalists in weightlifting
World Weightlifting Championships medalists
Weightlifters at the 2016 Summer Olympics
Olympic weightlifters of China
Asian Games silver medalists for China
People from Yiyang
Weightlifters from Hunan
Medalists at the 2014 Asian Games
Weightlifters at the 2020 Summer Olympics
Olympic medalists in weightlifting
Olympic gold medalists for China
Medalists at the 2020 Summer Olympics
21st-century Chinese people